Austin Walker (January 5, 1883 – October 31, 1945) served  as mayor of Boise, Idaho, from 1942 to 1945.

Walker had served as acting mayor since February 1942 as the incumbent, H. W. Whillock, was a United States Navy officer during World War II. Walker was appointed mayor after Whillock formally resigned in May of that year. He was elected in his own right in 1943.

Walker died in October 1945 and was succeeded by Sam S. Griffin.

References

Sources
Mayors of Boise - Past and Present
Idaho State Historical Society Reference Series, Corrected List of Mayors, 1867-1996

1945 deaths
Mayors of Boise, Idaho
1883 births
20th-century American politicians